National Radio Television Afghanistan (RTA;  Da Afġanistan Mīlī Radīo Telvizoon,  Rādīo Telvizoon-e Mīlī-e Afġānestān, branded as ملی (meaning national)) is the public-broadcasting organization of Afghanistan, based in Kabul. This governmental organ has a national television station (Afghanistan National Television) and a radio station (Radio Afghanistan) as well as news media. Atiqullah Azizi is the current  Director General since September 2021.

History
Radio Afghanistan started with Radio Kabul in 1925 (1304 by the Iranian calendar), during the era of King Amanullah Khan. Two radio transmitters with the capacity of 400 watts were procured from the German company of Telefunken, one of those has been installed on Koti Londoni near the bridge of Artel  which subsequently started to its operation and the second one had been transferred to Kandahar which on that period the musical programs and news were only being broadcast for few hours. Television broadcasting facilities and studios were constructed in 1976 with grant aid from Japan, and the television broadcasts started on 19 August 1978.

Radio Television Afghanistan has regional sub-stations for all provinces of Afghanistan which operate radio services, and in some provinces, basic television at a provincial level. They broadcast material produced at a provincial level, interspersed with news bulletins distributed by the Kabul-based news desk. These stations are usually closely affiliated with the provincial governors' offices. Broadcast content includes high volumes of government messaging.

Gallery

See also
 Bakhtar News Agency

References

 Sat Updates

External links
 

Mass media in Afghanistan
Pashto mass media
Pashto-language television stations
Persian-language television stations
Multilingual broadcasters
Television channels and stations established in 1974
Radio stations established in 1925
Publicly funded broadcasters
Soviet foreign aid